Agia Varvara (or Ayvarvara) is a village located in the Paphos District of Cyprus. Prior to 1974, the village was largely inhabited by Turkish Cypriots. Afterwards, the Turkish Cypriot population was relocated to Karavas, Trachoni, Pentageia, Famagusta and Morphou and was partially replaced by displaced Greek Cypriots from the north.

References

Communities in Paphos District
Turkish Cypriot villages depopulated after the 1974 Turkish invasion of Cyprus